Fairview Avenue is one of three railroad stations on Metra's BNSF Line in Downers Grove, Illinois. As of 2018, Fairview Avenue is the 113th busiest of Metra's 236 non-downtown stations, with an average of 415 weekday boardings. Though its official address is on Fairview Avenue (hence the name) and Burlington Avenue, the main parking lot is on the south side of the tracks off of nearby Second Street. All parking lots, including the main parking lot are managed by the Village of Downers Grove.

Fairview Avenue station has a colonial barn-type design more akin to railroad stations of the Northeastern United States, such as those on the Long Island Rail Road, and also matching the adjacent Pepperidge Farm bakery. Currently no buses run near the station.

On August 26, 1991, a 41-year-old woman, Mary T. Wojtyla, was killed at this station after being struck by a westbound Metra express train. The accident was captured on camera by a railfan and an edited version of the footage cutting out the moment of impact is often used by Operation Lifesaver to stress the importance of rail safety.

References

External links

Mike's Railroad Crossing Website:
Fairview Avenue Crossing Images
Modern view of station house
Flickr - Fairview Avenue Station
Station from Fairview Avenue from Google Maps Street View

Metra stations in Illinois
Former Chicago, Burlington and Quincy Railroad stations
Downers Grove, Illinois
Railway stations in DuPage County, Illinois
Railway stations in the United States opened in 1917